Romualda Hofertienė (25 October 1941 in Girkalnis – 9 June 2017) was a Lithuanian politician. In 1990 she was among those who signed the Act of the Re-Establishment of the State of Lithuania.

References

External links
 Biography

1941 births
2017 deaths
People from Raseiniai District Municipality
Women members of the Seimas
Signatories of the Act of the Re-Establishment of the State of Lithuania
20th-century Lithuanian women politicians
20th-century Lithuanian politicians
Members of the Seimas